German submarine U-541 was a Type IXC U-boat of Nazi Germany's Kriegsmarine during World War II.

She was laid down at the Deutsche Werft (yard) in Hamburg as yard number 362 on 5 June 1942, launched on 5 January 1943 and commissioned on 24 March with Kapitänleutnant Kurt Petersen (Crew 36) in command.

U-541 began her service career with training as part of the 4th U-boat Flotilla from 24 March 1943. She was reassigned to the 10th flotilla for operations on 1 November, then the 33rd flotilla on 1 November 1944.

She carried out four patrols and sank one ship. She was a member of four wolfpacks.

She surrendered on 12 May 1945 at Gibraltar and was transferred to Lisahally in Northern Ireland for Operation Deadlight. She was sunk on 5 January 1946.

Design
German Type IXC/40 submarines were slightly larger than the original Type IXCs. U-541 had a displacement of  when at the surface and  while submerged. She had two shafts and two  propellers.

U-541 was fitted with six  torpedo tubes (four fitted at the bow and two at the stern), 22 torpedoes, one  SK C/32 naval gun, 180 rounds, and a  SK C/30 as well as a  C/30 anti-aircraft gun. The boat had a complement of forty-eight.

Service history

First patrol
U-541s first patrol began with her departure from Kiel on 4 November 1943. She passed through the gap separating Iceland and the Faroe Islands before heading out into the Atlantic Ocean.

She entered Lorient, on the French Atlantic coast, on 9 January 1944.

Second and third patrols
For her second foray, U-541 headed toward the eastern seaboard of North America.

On her third sortie, she sank the Livingston northeast of Louisbourg, Nova Scotia.

The boat was preparing to attack a convoy while on the surface in the Gulf of St. Lawrence when  opened fire; U-541 was forced to dive. She was then hunted for two days by four frigates, a minesweeper and aircraft of the Royal Canadian Air Force (RCAF), but escaped.

On 26 May 1944, on its way from Lisbon (departure 16 May 1944) to Port Richmond, Philadelphia, USA (arrival 30 May 1944), the Serpa Pinto was stopped in the mid-Atlantic by the U-541. The U-boat's captain ordered the Serpa Pinto crew and passengers to abandon the ship in the lifeboats, and requested permission from Kriegsmarine headquarters to torpedo the ship. The passengers and crew, with the exception of the captain who decided to remain on board whatever the German decision, duly left the ship in the lifeboats. There they were forced to wait all night while the German U-boat awaited a reply to its request. By dawn an answer had arrived from Admiral Karl Dönitz, who refused permission to sink the ship. The U-boat then departed the area and the lifeboats returned to the ship. The ship's doctor, a cooker and a 15 months child drowned during this incident. Two military-aged Americans were taken in the submarine.

Fourth patrol
Her last patrol began in Horten Naval Base in Norway on 7 April 1945. It ended with her surrender in Gibraltar on 12 May 1945.

Fate
U-541 was transferred to Lisahally in Northern Ireland for Operation Deadlight.

Wolfpacks
U-541 took part in four wolfpacks, namely:
 Coronel (4 – 8 December 1943)
 Coronel 2 (8 – 14 December 1943)
 Coronel 3 (14 – 17 December 1943)
 Borkum (18 – 26 December 1943)

Summary of raiding history

References

Bibliography

External links

German Type IX submarines
U-boats commissioned in 1943
U-boats sunk in 1946
World War II submarines of Germany
1943 ships
World War II shipwrecks in the Atlantic Ocean
Ships built in Hamburg
Operation Deadlight
U-boats sunk by British warships
Maritime incidents in 1946